The Galloping Ghost is a 1931 American pre-Code Mascot serial film co-directed by B. Reeves Eason and Benjamin H. Kline. The title is the nickname of the star, real life American football player Red Grange. Lon Chaney Jr. had a small uncredited part in it as a henchman.

Plot
Red Grange is thrown off the Clay College football team in disgrace when his friend, Buddy Courtland, takes a bribe to throw the big game and Red attacks him.  Red then proceeds to investigate and hunt down the head of the gambling ring responsible. Red eventually clears his name and both he and Buddy are reinstated on the team.

Cast
Harold 'Red' Grange as Red Grange, Clay College football star 
Ralph Bushman as Buddy Courtland
Dorothy Gulliver as Barbara Courtland (Red's girlfriend)
Tom Dugan as Jerry, Red's sidekick
Gwen Lee as Irene Courtland, Buddy's wife
Theodore Lorch as Dr. Julian Blake, brain surgeon
Walter Miller as George Elton
Edward Hearn as Coach Harlow
Edward Peil, Sr. as Coach of Baxter Team
Stepin Fetchit as Snowball
Wilfred Lucas as a Sportscaster
Frank Brownlee as Tom, garage manager
Ernie Adams as Brady, henchman
Dick Dickinson as Mogul Taxi Clerk, henchman
Tom London as Mullins, henchman
Yakima Canutt as a henchman (uncredited)
Lon Chaney, Jr. as a henchman (uncredited)
Fred Toones as a Football Fan (uncredited)

Production
Grange received this starring role thanks to his business manager, and theater owner, Frank Zambrino. The serial took three weeks to film and Grange earned $4,500 overall.

Director B. Reeves Eason was reportedly fired during filming and replaced by the uncredited Benjamin H. Kline.

Stunts
This serial was filmed at a time before "stuntmen did mostly everything" which meant that Grange had to do a lot of his own stunts.

Chapter titles
 The Idol of Clay
 Port of Peril
 The Master Mind
 The House of Secrets
 The Man Without a Face
 The Torn $500 Bill
 When the Lights Went Out
 The Third Degree
 Sign in the Sky
 The Vulture's Lair
 The Radio Patrol
 The Ghost comes Back
Source:

See also
 List of film serials by year
 List of film serials by studio

References

External links

1931 films
1930s English-language films
1931 crime films
American football films
American black-and-white films
Mascot Pictures film serials
Films directed by B. Reeves Eason
Films produced by Nat Levine
American crime films
1930s American films